Dr. John B. Patrick House also known as the Patrick-Bherman-Smith House and Moultrieville Brothel, is a historic home located at Sullivan's Island, Charleston County, South Carolina. The house was built about 1870, and is a -story, symmetrical  frame residence with a two-tiered, integral wraparound piazza. It features an expansive hipped roof with dormers and stairs that lead to the second tier of the piazza. A small rectangular frame structure, built about 1920 as a general store, is located on the property.

It was listed on the National Register of Historic Places in 1995.

References

Commercial buildings on the National Register of Historic Places in South Carolina
Houses on the National Register of Historic Places in South Carolina
Houses completed in 1870
Commercial buildings completed in 1920
Houses in Charleston County, South Carolina
National Register of Historic Places in Charleston County, South Carolina